Liosomadoras is a genus of driftwood catfishes found in tropical South America.

Species 
There are currently two described species in this genus:
 Liosomadoras morrowi Fowler, 1940
 Liosomadoras oncinus (Jardine, 1841) (Jaguar catfish)

References

Auchenipteridae
Fish of South America
Fish of Brazil
Catfish genera
Taxa named by Henry Weed Fowler